Harunori (written: 治則 or 治憲) is a masculine Japanese given name. Notable people with the name include:

, Japanese billionaire real estate developer
, Japanese daimyō

Japanese masculine given names